The 2 × 5 kilometre pursuit cross-country skiing competition at the 2002 Winter Olympics in Salt Lake City, United States, was held on 24 February at Soldier Hollow.

This competition consisted of two races. The first race was a 5 kilometre classical race and the second was a 5 km freestyle pursuit where the competitors started based on their times from the classical race. The winner was the first competitor to cross the finish line in the second race.

The race
This event was changed in 2002 as the short-distance classical event no longer was used as the first section of the event. Rather the event was skied in two sections on the same day, with classical skied first, followed by the freestyle pursuit, both sections now over 5 km. The morning classical leg was won by Olga Danilova with her teammate Larisa Lazutina in second. They had a lead of over seven seconds on Slovenian Petra Majdič. The Russians were not as strong in the freestyle, but still won the gold and silver medals easily, Danilova seven seconds ahead of Lazutina, who was 10 seconds ahead of Beckie Scott. The battle for the bronze was very close. Canadian Scott had been sixth in the classical section, with Czech skier Kateřina Neumannová in eighth, trailing Scott by 10.1 seconds. But Neumannová closed on Scott by the last kilometer but could never pass her, Scott holding on to make the podium.

In October 2003 it was confirmed that Danilova had tested positive for darbepoetin, an erythropoietin analogue, and was disqualified. Later Lazutina was also found to have tested positive for darbepoetin, and was disqualified. At the end of 2003, Beckie Scott was awarded the gold medal. Neumannová being moved up to silver, and the bronze medal going to German Viola Bauer. This was the first ever gold medal for Canada in Nordic skiing.

Results 
The 5 km classical race was started at 09:00 and 5 km freestyle pursuit at 11:30.

References

Women's cross-country skiing at the 2002 Winter Olympics
Women's pursuit cross-country skiing at the Winter Olympics